Trade register may refer to:

 Finnish Trade Register
 German Trade Register

See also 
List of company registers
Companies Registration Office (Ireland)
Companies House, England and Wales
Companies and Intellectual Property Commission (CIPC), South Africa